Verticordia densiflora var. cespitosa is a flowering plant in the myrtle family, Myrtaceae and is endemic to the south-west of Western Australia. It is a shrub with small leaves and pink, or pink and white flowers. It is one of five varieties of the species Verticordia densiflora.

Description

The flowers are silvery-pink to bright mauve-pink and white, sometimes all pale to deep pink. Flowering occurs from October to May.

Taxonomy and naming
Verticordia cespitosa was first formally described by Nikolai Turczaninow in 1847 and the description was published in Bulletin de la Société Impériale des Naturalistes de Moscou. In 1991, Alex George undertook a review of the genus Verticordia, described five varieties of Verticordia densiflora and recognised V. cespitosa as a variety of V. densiflora. The epithet "cespitosa" is "from the Latin caespitosus (tufted), in reference to the habit of the type specimen, deliberately spelt cespitosa by Nicolas Turczaninow", both in the protologue and on the holotype sheet.

Distribution and habitat
This variety of V. densiflora grows in sand, often associated with granite or spongolite, sometimes in poorly drained, low-lying areas. It is found in heath, shrubland or woodland from near Geraldton in the north to near Esperance on the south coast and inland as far as Dowerin. It occurs in the Avon Wheatbelt, Coolgardie, Esperance Plains, Geraldton Sandplains, Jarrah Forest, Mallee and Swan Coastal Plain biogeographic regions.

Conservation
Verticordia densiflora var. cespitosa is classified as "not threatened" by the Western Australian Government Department of Parks and Wildlife.

Use in horticulture
There are several forms of this variety - one is a tall, open shrub which often has large flower heads and another is compact, rounded and produces masses of flowers. Both are relatively hardy plants, even in more humid areas such as Sydney, will grow in a range of soils and are relatively tolerant of frost. Propagation is easy from cuttings and from seed, although the germination rate is relatively low.

References

densiflora var. cespitosa
Rosids of Western Australia
Eudicots of Western Australia
Plants described in 1847